Christopher Woodcroft (born March 14, 1965 in Hamilton, Ontario) is an educator and retired male wrestler from Canada. He was principal of Resurrection Catholic Secondary School in Kitchener, Ontario, and was one of 40 Canadian educators to receive the Canada's Outstanding Principal award from The Learning Partnership in January 2015.

Woodcroft represented Canada at 
the 1988 Summer Olympics in Seoul, South Korea and
the 1992 Summer Olympics in Barcelona, Spain. 
He placed 11th in his class (52.0 kg Freestyle) at the 
1994 World Championship. He won medals at the 
1986 Commonwealth Games (gold),
1987 Pan American Games (silver), and
1991 Pan American Games (bronze).

References

1965 births
Living people
Commonwealth Games gold medallists for Canada
Olympic wrestlers of Canada
Sportspeople from Hamilton, Ontario
Wrestlers at the 1988 Summer Olympics
Wrestlers at the 1992 Summer Olympics
Canadian male sport wrestlers
Wrestlers at the 1986 Commonwealth Games
Wrestlers at the 1994 Commonwealth Games
Wrestling people from Ontario
Pan American Games silver medalists for Canada
Pan American Games bronze medalists for Canada
Commonwealth Games medallists in wrestling
Pan American Games medalists in wrestling
Wrestlers at the 1987 Pan American Games
Wrestlers at the 1991 Pan American Games
Medalists at the 1987 Pan American Games
Medallists at the 1986 Commonwealth Games